N50, partially known as Rijksweg 50 and Rijksweg 838, is a road connecting Rijksweg 6 (A6) in Emmeloord with A50 and A28 / European route E232 (E 232) at the Hattemerbroek interchange in Zwolle.

The road is maintained by Rijkswaterstaat.

Route description
N50 starts at the Hattemerbroek interchange and travels to the north–west. A railroad runs parallel to the road until Kampen. Just before exit 31, the road passes over a bridge. This bridge has been constructed because a river will be flowing under it in the near future. The road runs along Kampen, and just before traveling across river IJssel using the Eilandbrug, there is an incomplete exit, exit 32a, created for trucks to serve the industrial area of Kampen. A little later, N50 runs across river Ramsdiep using the Ramspolbrug. From this bridge up to the town of Ens at exit  33, provincial road N765 (N765) runs parallel to the road. The highway travels further, and reaches its northern terminus at the Emmeloord interchange with Rijksweg 6 (A6) near Emmeloord.

History
Over time, N50 has changed significantly over its entire length. From the Hattermerbroek interchange up to Kampen, there used to be fewer lanes. A bridge has been created for the future river to flow under it, just before reaching Kampen. In Kampen, the road used to travel through the center. 

After exit 32a, a combined cable-stayed and bascule bridge Eilandbrug was completed in 2003 to cross the river IJssel. The bridge across rivers Ramsdiep and Ramsgeul has been rebuilt in 2010.

Junction list

See also

References

External links

50
50
50
50